Active Fuel Management (formerly known as displacement on demand (DoD)) is a trademarked name for the automobile variable displacement technology from General Motors. It allows a V6 or V8 engine to "turn off" half of the cylinders under light-load conditions to improve fuel economy. Estimated performance on EPA tests shows a 5.5–7.5% improvement in fuel economy. 

GM's  Active Fuel Management  technology used a solenoid to deactivate the lifters on selected cylinders of a pushrod V-layout engine.

GM used the Active Fuel Management technology on a range of engines including with the GM Small Block Gen IV engine family; First-generation GM EcoTec3 engine family; Second-generation GM High-Feature V6 DOHC engine family; and First-generation High-Feature V8 DOHC engine family.  Vehicle applications included the 2005 Chevy TrailBlazer EXT, the GMC Envoy XL, Envoy XUV and Pontiac Grand Prix.

Third generation
In January 2018, GM announced an improved version of AFM called Dynamic Fuel Management to be initially released in Chevy Silverado trucks. This system shuts off any number of cylinders in a variety of combinations, maximizing fuel economy and avoiding switching between banks of cylinders
.
The system is based on Dynamic Skip Fire, a technology developed by California company Tula Technology. The 6.2L V8 engine of the Chevrolet Silverado incorporating the technology was named one of Ward's 10 Best Engines for 2019.

See also
 Variable displacement
 Honda's Variable Cylinder Management (VCM)
 Chrysler's Multi-Displacement System (MDS)
 Daimler AG's Active Cylinder Control (ACC)
 Start-stop system
 Cadillac Variable Displacement V8-6-4 L62 Engine

References

External links
 XV8 concept engine
 XV12 concept engine
 Opel Signum² press release

Engine technology
Automotive technology tradenames